Mads H. Thomsen (born 15 March 1989) is a former Danish professional football forward, who last played for BSV.

External links
National team profile
Career statistics at Danmarks Radio

1989 births
Living people
Danish men's footballers
Lyngby Boldklub players
FC Nordsjælland players
Danish Superliga players
Association football forwards
Allerød FK players
People from Allerød Municipality
Sportspeople from the Capital Region of Denmark